Timothy Aloysius Cadwallader "Dum Dum" Dugan is a character appearing in American comic books published by Marvel Comics. He is an officer of S.H.I.E.L.D. and is one of the most experienced members of Nick Fury's team, known for his marksmanship with rifles and trademark bowler hat.

Neal McDonough appeared as the character in the 2011 Marvel Cinematic Universe film Captain America: The First Avenger, the 2013 Marvel Studios short film Agent Carter (post-credits), in 2014 in the 1st episode of season 2 of Agents of S.H.I.E.L.D., and also in 2015 in the fifth episode of the first season of Marvel's Agent Carter. McDonough returned as an alternate version of the character in the Disney+ animated series What If...? (2021).

Publication history

Dum Dum Dugan first appeared in Sgt. Fury and his Howling Commandos #1 (May 1963), and was created by Stan Lee and Jack Kirby.

Dum Dum Dugan received an entry in the Official Handbook of the Marvel Universe Update '89 #2.

Fictional character biography
Dum Dum Dugan was originally portrayed as a British citizen in Sgt Fury #1, but later retconned to be born in Boston, Massachusetts. During World War II, while working as a circus strongman, Dugan helps Nick Fury and Sam "Happy" Sawyer escape the Nazis during a mission, recounted in issue #34. Dugan joins the British Army, and when Sawyer is charged with creating Fury's First Attack Squad, formally listed as "Able Company" and nicknamed the Howling Commandos, Sawyer invites Dugan to transfer into the US Army and become Fury's second-in-command. Dugan's exceptional strength saves the day in several of his adventures in the Sgt. Fury comic books. Dugan is an enlisted man with the rank of corporal, and wears the chevrons  of his rank on the front top of his trademark bowler hat throughout World War II.

Dugan leaves the U.S. Army before the Korean War, but rejoins during the war as Second Lieutenant under the promoted First Lieutenant Fury, once again as his second-in-command of the reformed Howling Commandos.  Fury had already received a battlefield promotion to Second Lt. earlier.  Dugan remains with Fury when Fury continues his military career into the Vietnam War, as shown in Sgt. Fury and his Howling Commandos Annual #3 and 4, and later into espionage work. Dugan's exact rank is not stated, but he is addressed as "Captain" at one point. He remains with Fury when Fury goes into the CIA and later into the original S.H.I.E.L.D.

Different accounts state that Dugan and other members of Fury's Howling Commandos receive the Infinity Formula to explain how they all remain youthful and active despite being all into their 60s and 70s in the modern era. Other stories contradict this artificial maintenance of youth by Dugan as merely dyeing his hair and suffering a heart attack.

Later on in life, he is placed in charge of internal security on the S.H.I.E.L.D. Helicarrier.

Dum Dum is placed in charge of a SHIELD unit coined the Godzilla Squad, charged with the task of tracking and stopping the radioactive kaiju. Over the twenty-four issue series, Dugan goes from loathing the creature's destructive tendencies to accepting the beast's existence after Godzilla saves him on numerous occasions. Dugan later recalls a long list of his greatest nightmares, one of which includes Godzilla.

After suffering his heart attack, Dugan is formally promoted to Fury's permanent second-in-command of S.H.I.E.L.D. as "Deputy Director", though he has acted as such before his formal appointment.

Power struggles
In Marvel Graphic Novel #18: She-Hulk, Dum Dum Dugan ran S.H.I.E.L.D. during one of Nick Fury's absences. His authority is usurped by the craven, sex-obsessed agent Roger Dooley. She-Hulk and her boyfriend Wyatt Wingfoot are illegally captured. Dugan protests Dooley's forcible strip search of She-Hulk in public but is overruled. His authority is regained when Dooley is killed in action.

Nick Fury vs. S.H.I.E.L.D. (1988)
During the Nick Fury vs. S.H.I.E.L.D. six issue series, Dum Dum Dugan and, later, the entirety of S.H.I.E.L.D., deal with another mutiny from within. Dugan was shown to have been shot to death while taking out the trash. In this series, Hydra was revealed to have been a sister organization of S.H.I.E.L.D., with both directly controlled by the mysterious council, who had replaced many of the organization's top brass - including Deputy Director Dugan - with Life Model Decoy android duplicates to speed the survival of the fittest selection process that the council had been forcing between the two organizations over the decades. All the officers who were thought to be killed were shown to have been replaced with Life Model Decoy android replacements and were found alive. Dugan retires, along with many of the older officers, at the end of this series. Dugan's retirement does not last long, as he rejoins Fury when the next version of S.H.I.E.L.D. (now known as Strategic Hazard Intervention Espionage Logistics Directorate) is created.

Dugan calls on Squirrel Girl to help him take down various supervillains.

With Nick Fury's absence at the S.H.I.E.L.D. headquarters, Dugan is placed second-in-command to Maria Hill. Dugan is put in charge of mutant affairs, and deals with Wolverine. Dugan apparently knows a dire secret to Logan's past.

Civil War
In Marvel's Civil War crossover, Dum Dum Dugan and several other S.H.I.E.L.D. agents are sent to capture his fugitive friend Captain America. The entire group is defeated. He expresses regret to fellow agent Sharon Carter for trying to capture his friend. He also states his concerns about losing faith in S.H.I.E.L.D due to the war and the way the organization is run under Director Maria Hill.

After the events of Civil War and as Tony Stark takes over as director of S.H.I.E.L.D., Dugan turns in his letter of resignation, stating that he does not approve of the changes Stark has made, or the way he runs the organization. Dugan's resignation is not accepted however, as he is too vital to S.H.I.E.L.D.; despite his disapproval of Stark's leadership, Stark still trusts Dugan, and Dugan alone, with the command of a weapon that could send an abandoned Manhattan into the Negative Zone, destroying the island and anyone inside during World War Hulk, stating that Hulk and the Warbound are too dangerous a global threat to leave Manhattan free. Stark trusts that Dugan will know the appropriate time to execute the plan, if at all. Dugan never used the weapon.

Dugan later proved his worth and loyalty to S.H.I.E.L.D during a confrontation with Maria Hill, where he forced her to confront the fact that she was apparently willing to take actions that would allow innocent people to die while still sticking to 'the book' because the alternative was to disobey orders, informing her that some situations weren't in 'the book'. Inspired by Dugan's words, Hill ended up putting her career on the line by locking down the United Nations under S.H.I.E.L.D. martial law so Stark could escape a tribunal and track down the Mandarin, with Dugan providing Stark with a version of the Silver Centurion armor after his Extremis abilities were deactivated.

Dum Dum is stabbed through the chest by Wolverine's son Daken.

Secret Invasion
It was later revealed that, shortly after Captain America's death, Dugan was ambushed and stabbed by a Skrull impersonating Contessa Valentina Allegra de la Fontaine who then took his place. The Dugan impostor destroys the Peak, S.W.O.R.D.'s Orbital base, in a suicide strike that allows the Skrull armada to invade Earth. After the invasion, Iron Man discovers the Skrull kidnap victims alive and well, including Dum Dum. Dugan is later shown in a support group meeting with the others that had been replaced by Skrulls. Dugan wanted to leave immediately but was convinced to stay.

Secret Warriors
After a confrontation that goes badly between Nick Fury's Secret Warriors and The Gorgon, Fury calls up Dum Dum Dugan's "Howling Commandos" PMC for help in Fury's missions, needing "a couple of nasty old bastards with a bad habit of shooting first and asking questions later." Dugan learns that the new S.H.I.E.L.D. organization has been controlled by their old enemies HYDRA right from the start, the same as the older incarnations of S.H.I.E.L.D. Dugan later shows up in Fury's efforts to bring down HYDRA and yet another secretive organization, the Russian Leviathan. Dugan and Jasper Sitwell soon became all that is left of the Howling Commandos PMC after battles with HYDRA and Leviathan and are arrested by the U.N.. At the end of Secret Warriors, Dugan and Sitwell were released.

Dugan is recruited as part of a multi-verse wide effort to stop a supernatural-powered Nazi zombie army. Assisted by Howard the Duck he takes a team of warriors to the affected reality and manages to neutralize the threat at the source.

A HYDRA group attempts to devastate civilization via super-powered shock-troops and media that inflames people's personal beliefs into irrationality. Dugan leads the effort in destroying this group, often with high explosives. He works closely with Sharon Carter and the Falcon. Dugan is severely wounded in the upper arm but recovers.

Original Sin
During the Original Sin storyline, it is revealed Dum Dum Dugan was killed in 1966 while on a Black Ops mission, and Nick Fury - the only other person who knew about the mission and Dugan's death - had his body preserved and Dugan's mind tied into a transmission device that projected his consciousness into an advanced LMD; Fury claimed that this was done because he did not want to lose his best friend and felt that he needed Dugan to serve as his conscience. When Dugan finds out, he accuses Fury of doing this so that he could feel guilty about things, reasoning that Fury could convince himself that he was still a hero if he felt bad about his actions as the man on the wall. Telling Fury not to bring him back again if they were ever friends, Dugan thinking he was nothing but a mechanical fraud and Fury saying nothing to let Dugan think otherwise, then shoots himself in the head.

Involvement with S.T.A.K.E.
Months later, Maria Hill deemed it necessary to bring the LMD of Dugan back and removed the blocks that prevented his resurrection so he could return to Area 13 and help S.T.A.K.E. (short for the Special Threat Assessment for Known Extranormalities).

Dum Dum Dugan is later appointed to lead the latest incarnation of the Howling Commandos.

During the Avengers: Standoff! storyline, Dum Dum Dugan discovered that Dr. Paul Kraye had Maria Hill imprison Orrgo at Pleasant Hill. Upon locating Pleasant Hill, Dum Dum Dugan leads the Howling Commandos to Pleasant Hill where they fight past the inmates. When they confront Kobik, she teleports the Howling Commandos back to S.T.A.K.E. HQ. Once back at S.T.A.K.E. HQ, Dum Dum Dugan learns from Orrgo that Paul Kraye released all the inmates there to cause havoc, causing the Howling Commandos to spring into action.

Involvement with C.R.A.D.L.E.
During the "Outlawed" storyline, Dum Dum Dugan appears as a member of C.R.A.D.L.E. when a law is passed that forbids superheroes who are below the age of 21. Dum Dum Dugan led some C.R.A.D.L.E. agents to arrest Spider-Man for teen vigilantism. But Spider-Man escapes them, leaving Dugan embarrassed for being defeated. C.R.A.D.L.E. uses Spider-Man's prior history and came too close to him at Brooklyn Visions Academy.

Other versions

1602
In Marvel 1602, the commander of Sir Nicholas Fury's soldiers is named Dougan. In 1602: New World, he is the defender of the Roanoke Colony.

Earth X
Dugan appears, on the other side of the afterlife, in the climactic battle against Mephisto's forces in Earth X Volume 1, issue 'X'. Along with multiple modern superheroes, Dugan fights with many of his old 'Howling Commandos' comrades. He had perished due to being taken by the Hydra entity.

The Transformers
Dum Dum Dugan and Nick Fury show up in the issue "Prisoner of War!" from The Transformers as guest characters along with Peter Parker and Joe Robertson. They also reference Godzilla's comic in this appearance, though not by name, due to Marvel no longer holding the licence at the time.

Ultimate Marvel
Dugan appears in Ultimate X-Men several times, once at the end of the Blockbuster storyline, then again, during New Mutants, and one more time as a hologram at the beginning of the Magnetic North story arc. Here, Dugan is scarred and aging but physically fit, and is S.H.I.E.L.D.'s Director of Mutant Operations. He has a mysterious connection to Wolverine, even remembering Logan's real name while Wolverine himself couldn't recall it. Also of note is that this version of Dugan has never been seen with the mainstream version's trademark derby hat. In the "Ultimate Origins" five-parter it is shown that he was involved with Project: Rebirth, the project that made Captain America, appearing as an already grown man in 1943, essentially replacing Chester Phillips in Mainstream continuity. Thanks to a runaway mutant, Dugan and Nick Fury led a strike team at the Weapon X facility, but not before killing Malcolm Colcord on the true origins behind mutants, and rescuing T'Challa Udaku.

In other media

Television
 Dum Dum Dugan has a non-speaking cameo appearance in the X-Men episode "Old Soldiers".
 Dum Dum Dugan appears in the 1990s Iron Man series, voiced by W. Morgan Sheppard.
 Dum Dum Dugan, referred to as Timothy Dugan, appears in the television film Nick Fury: Agent of Shield, portrayed by Garry Chalk.
 Dum Dum Dugan appears in The Super Hero Squad Show episode "Wrath of the Red Skull!". He was seen in a flashback with Gabe Jones and Izzy Cohen.
 Dum Dum Dugan appears in The Avengers: Earth's Mightiest Heroes, voiced by John DiMaggio.
 Neal McDonough reprised his role in the season 2 premiere of Agents of S.H.I.E.L.D. titled "Shadows". He was present with Peggy Carter and the SSR when they raided a HYDRA base and arrested Daniel Whitehall and the HYDRA agents with him.
 McDonough reprised his role in the season 1 Agent Carter episode "The Iron Ceiling". He and the Howling Commandos assist Peggy Carter and Jack Thompson in raiding a Russian facility that had ties to Leviathan. Dugan was also brought up to speed about Howard Stark being framed for selling deadly weapons by Leviathan.
 McDonough reprised his role as Dum Dum Dugan in Marvel Rising Ultimate Comics.
 McDonough reprised his role in the Disney+ animated series, What If...?

Film

 Dum Dum Dugan appears in the 2011 Marvel Studios film Captain America: The First Avenger, portrayed by Neal McDonough. He is part of a freed POW squad that destroys multiple HYDRA fortresses under the leadership of Captain America.
 McDonough reprises his role in the Marvel One-Shot short film Agent Carter.

Video games
 Dugan administers medical aid to Nick Fury with the help of Kathleen Neville in the continue screen of the 1993 Punisher arcade game.
 Dum Dum Dugan appears as a non-playable hero in the video game Marvel: Ultimate Alliance voiced by Scott MacDonald.
 Dum Dum Dugan appears as a member of the S.H.I.E.L.D. team that confronts the Punisher in the final cutscene of the 2009 PlayStation Network game The Punisher: No Mercy.
 Dum Dum Dugan appears in Captain America: Super Soldier, voiced by Neal McDonough.
 Dum Dum Dugan appears in Marvel Heroes, voiced by Michael Benyaer.
 Dum Dum Dugan appeared as a playable character in Lego Marvel's Avengers.
 Dum Dum Dugan appears in Marvel Avengers Academy, voiced by Billy Kametz.
 Dum Dum Dugan appears as a supporting character in Marvel's Avengers.

See also
 List of S.H.I.E.L.D. members

References

External links
 Marvel Directory: Dum Dum Dugan

Avengers (comics) characters
Characters created by Jack Kirby
Characters created by Stan Lee
Comics characters introduced in 1963
Fictional characters from Boston
Fictional circus performers
Fictional Korean War veterans
Fictional secret agents and spies
Fictional special forces personnel
Fictional United States Army Rangers personnel
Fictional World War II veterans
Howling Commandos
Marvel Comics martial artists
Marvel Comics sidekicks
Marvel Comics superheroes
S.H.I.E.L.D. agents